The 1933 Liège–Bastogne–Liège was the 23rd edition of the Liège–Bastogne–Liège cycle race and was held on 25 May 1933. The race started and finished in Liège. The race was won by François Gardier.

General classification

References

1933
1933 in Belgian sport